Jesse P. Fuller (September 29, 1901 - January 19, 1962) was an American politician from Maine. Fuller, a Republican from South Portland, served in the Maine House of Representatives from 1951 to 1958. From 1953 to 1954, Fuller was House Majority Leader.

References

1901 births
1962 deaths
Maine Republicans
Politicians from South Portland, Maine
Majority leaders of the Maine House of Representatives